Borgato is an Italian surname. Notable people with the surname include:

Agostino Borgato (1871–1939), Italian actor and film director
Francesco Borgato (born 1990), Italian singer and dancer
Giada Borgato (born 1989), Italian cyclist
Giovanni Borgato (1897–1975), Italian footballer
Luigi Borgato (born 1963), Italian piano maker

Italian-language surnames